Hunter Island, or Hunters Island, is a large land mass — now known not to be an actual island — which occupies the area between the two most historically significant fur trade waterway routes in northern Ontario, Canada: the Kaministiquia and the Grand Portage. It is an area of large, remote and windy lakes and is now the southern half of the Quetico Provincial Park.

Geography 

Hunter Island is bounded to the south by Ottertrack, Knife, and Basswood lakes on the international Canada–United States border, to the east by Saganaga Lake, to the north by Kawnipi and Sturgeon lakes, and on the west by the Maligne River. With the Saganaga-Maligne drainage to the east and north and the Basswood drainage to the south and west, Hunter Island can be thought of as a peninsula connected to the United States across the  Monument Portage between Swamp and Ottertrack Lakes.

History 

A very early French map of the region indicates Iles des Chasseurs ("Isles of the Hunters") for the area now called Hunter Island.

In the 1890s, the Hunter Island region was the focus of a boundary dispute between the United States and Canada, owing to the millions of tons of iron ore in the area. The controversy was settled in favour of Canada.

Canoeing 

It passes through some of the busiest access points to the park and wilderness areas as well as many notable natural and historical features.

Lakes of the Hunter Island region 
 Agnes Lake
 Kahshahpiwi Lake
 Kawnipi Lake
 Saganaga Lake
 Sarah Lake
 McIntyre Lake
 Brent Lake
 Basswood Lake
 Sturgeon Lake (Quetico)

References 

Canada–United States border
Islands of Ontario
Landforms of Rainy River District